Mastalli is an Italian surname. Notable people with the surname include:

Alessandro Mastalli (born 1996), Italian footballer
Chiara Mastalli (born 1984), Italian film and television actress

Italian-language surnames